Matteo Gamba (born 19 October 1979) is an Italian rally driver from Bergamo.

Career
In his WRC debut, he achieved a personal best ninth place as a privateer entry and his first-ever points. He drove a Peugeot 207 S2000.

Career results

WRC results

References

External links
WRC Results (eWRC)

1979 births
Living people
Italian rally drivers
World Rally Championship drivers